Road signs in Lithuania ensure that transport vehicles move safely and orderly, as well as to inform the participants of traffic built-in graphic icons. These icons are governed by the Vienna Convention on Road Traffic and Vienna Convention on Road Signs and Signals.

Sign design is most similar to countries that comprised the now dissolved USSR with most of the signs having identical design. This includes neighboring Belarus, Russia, Ukraine. Neighboring Post-Soviet Baltic countries Latvia and Estonia which were also part of Soviet Union have modified their road sign designs a little bit further than the road sign standard that was applied for the whole USSR before dissolution in the early 1990s.

Lithuanian road sign design saw minor changes in 2014. Some of the warning signs design were changed, a few new signs were added, like the sign indicating speed bump (formerly uneven road sign was used for indicating speed bumps), or sign indicating emergency stopping lane. Also, Lithuania was the only post-Soviet state to use both a blue and green background on the "Motorway" road sign. Today, Lithuania uses only green background on the "Motorway" road sign, as do the rest of the post-Soviet states.

Warning signs

Priority signs

Prohibitory signs

Mandatory signs

Regulatory signs

Information signs

Service signs

Additional panels

References

Lithuania
Road transport in Lithuania